Jordan Clifford Smith (born 8 December 1994) is an English professional footballer who plays as a goalkeeper for Premier League club Nottingham Forest, but as of 1 February 2023, is on loan at EFL Championship side Huddersfield Town.

Club career

Nottingham Forest
After coming through the Nottingham Forest academy, for whom he had played since the age of seven, Smith spent spells on loan with Ilkeston and Nuneaton Town. He made his professional debut for Forest on 11 February 2017, coming on as a 23rd-minute substitute against Norwich City for the injured Stephen Henderson. Smith kept his first clean sheet for Forest on 25 February as the club drew 0–0 at Wigan Athletic.

Having impressed in goal, Smith agreed a new contract with the club on 4 April to extend his stay until 2020. Smith's good form continued into the last game of the season at home to Ipswich Town when, with the score at 0–0, he made two vital saves; the latter of which was described by manager Mark Warburton as "world-class". Forest won the game 3–0 to guarantee safety from relegation to League One, at the expense of Blackburn Rovers.

On 16 November 2018, Smith joined EFL League One side Barnsley on a seven-day emergency loan.

On 10 January 2019, Smith joined EFL League Two side Mansfield Town until the end of the 2018–19 season.

On 1 February 2023, Smith joined EFL Championship side Huddersfield Town on loan for the rest of the 2022–23 season.

Career statistics

Honours
Nottingham Forest
EFL Championship play-offs: 2022

References

External links

Living people
English footballers
Association football goalkeepers
Ilkeston F.C. players
Nuneaton Borough F.C. players
Nottingham Forest F.C. players
Barnsley F.C. players
Mansfield Town F.C. players
Huddersfield Town A.F.C. players
English Football League players
1994 births
People from South Normanton
Footballers from Derbyshire